Providence Seaside Hospital, is a non-profit, general hospital in Seaside in the U.S. state of Oregon. The Critical Access Hospital on the Oregon Coast is part of Providence Health & Services' hospital network.

History
In 1934, the former Mercer Hospital became Seaside Hospital. The city sold bonds in 1945 to pay for a new hospital, which opened the next year. In December 1967, the Oregon State Board of Health approved funds for a new facility to be located on land annexed into the city in January 1968. The hospital was previously located at South Franklin Street and S Avenue. Voters approved a $1.2 million bond in January 1968 to build a 55-bed hospital. A labor in February 2011 that started at the hospital led to a $1.9 million lawsuit when the baby died at a Portland hospital, with the lawsuit later settled.

Details
The hospital is licensed for 56 beds, but operates 25 as of 2015. Services at Providence Seaside include maternity, surgical, imaging, emergency department, and pediatrics, among others. For 2014, the hospital had a total of 948 discharges, with 3,376 patient days, 111 surgeries, 109 births, and 9,023 emergency department visits. For 2014, the hospital had $91.6 million in charges, provided $2 million in charity care, and had an operating revenue of $1.6 million.

See also
 List of hospitals in Oregon

References

Hospitals in Oregon
Buildings and structures in Clatsop County, Oregon
Seaside, Oregon